Ethmolaimus is a genus of nematodes belonging to the family Chromadoridae.

The species of this genus are found in Europe and Northern America.

Species:
 Ethmolaimus bothnicus Jensen, 1994 
 Ethmolaimus caudatus Alekseev & Naumova, 1979

References

Nematodes